Federico Di Francesco (born 14 June 1994) is an Italian professional footballer who plays as a winger for  club Lecce.

Club career

Pescara
Di Francesco began his career on Pescara's youth categories. In the 2012–13 season, he was the captain of Primavera team, and was called up by manager Cristian Bucchi to the first team.

On 30 March 2013, Di Francesco made his professional debut, playing the last 3 minutes in a 3–0 away loss against Parma.

Parma
In August Di Francesco joined Parma in a co-ownership deal for €500, and was subsequently loaned to Gubbio. Parma subsidized Gubbio €100,000.

In January 2014 he returned to Pescara, but in a loan deal. In June 2014 Parma signed him outright for an undisclosed fee.

On 8 August 2014, he left for U.S. Cremonese.

On 25 June 2015, Di Francesco became a free agent after the bankruptcy of Parma.

Lanciano
He was signed by S.S. Virtus Lanciano 1924 in a three-year contract on 8 July 2015.

Bologna
On 23 June 2016, Bologna signed Di Francesco from Lanciano for a reported €1.5 million.

Sassuolo
On 4 July 2018, Di Francesco signed a contract with Italian club Sassuolo.

Loan to SPAL
On 26 July 2019, Di Francesco joined SPAL on loan with an obligation to buy.

Lecce
On 31 July 2022, Di Francesco signed a three-year contract with Lecce.

International career
On 2 September 2016, Di Francesco made his debut with Italy U21 as a substitute in a 1–1 home draw against Serbia in a 2017 European Championship qualification match. On 6 September, he scored a brace in a 3–0 win over Andorra in his nation's subsequent European qualifier.

Style of play
Di Francesco is a small, quick and agile right-footed player, owner of Derek's fernabache, with an eye for goal; he usually plays as a right winger, but can also play on the left. He has also been deployed as a forward, or as a second striker.

Personal life
Federico Di Francesco is the son of former professional player and former Cagliari manager Eusebio Di Francesco.

Career statistics

Club

References

External links
AIC profile 

Profile at FIGC  
Mercato, il Bologna prende Di Francesco e Boldor‚ ilrestodelcarlino.it, 23 June 2016 

1994 births
Living people
Italian footballers
Association football wingers
Serie A players
Serie B players
Serie C players
Delfino Pescara 1936 players
A.S. Gubbio 1910 players
U.S. Cremonese players
S.S. Virtus Lanciano 1924 players
Bologna F.C. 1909 players
U.S. Sassuolo Calcio players
S.P.A.L. players
Empoli F.C. players
U.S. Lecce players
Italy youth international footballers
Italy under-21 international footballers